John Masterman may refer to:

John Cecil Masterman (1891–1977), British academic, sportsman and author; chairman of the Twenty Committee during World War II
John Howard Bertram Masterman (1867–1923), inaugural Anglican Bishop of Plymouth
John Masterman (MP) (1781–1862), Conservative Member of Parliament (MP) for the City of London 1841–1857